Giovanni Sala (born 23 November 1963) is an Italian enduro rider and a six-time World Enduro Champion (including the overall world championship title in 1998). He is also a four-time winner of the International Six Days Enduro (ISDE) World Trophy with Team Italy (in 1992, 1994, 1997 and 2000), and was the fastest overall in the competition in 1992, 1996 and 1997.

Sala competed his whole world championship career with KTM. He won his first title in the 500 cc class in 1993, and went on to take the 250 cc two-stroke titles in 1994, 1995 and 1998. In 1999, he won his final WEC title in the 400 cc world championship. Sala retired from the World Enduro Championship after the 2004 season, but has continued competing in the Italian Enduro Championship, where he has won several titles, and in the motorcycle class of the Dakar Rally. At the 2006 Dakar, Sala finished third. In 2011, Sala was named an FIM Legend for his motorcycling achievements.

Career summary

ISDE

References

External links
Official website

1963 births
Living people
Enduro riders
Italian motorcycle racers